The West African Footballer of the Year, or The Best of the Best was an association football award. It was presented to the west African player considered to have performed the best over the previous season. The award was conceived by the West Africa Football Union (WAFU), and was intended to be given annually beginning in 2010. The inaugural winner was Didier Drogba.

The WAFU was split into two regions in 2011.

Winners

References

African football trophies and awards
West Africa Football Union
Awards established in 2010